Diamer Division, also known as Diamer-Astore Division, is a first-order administrative division of Pakistan's dependent territory of Gilgit-Baltistan.

The divisional headquarters of the Diamer Division is the town of Chilas. The Diamer Division currently consists of four districts:

 Astore District
 Darel District
 Diamer District
 Tangir District

See also
 Chilas

References

Gilgit-Baltistan
Divisions of Pakistan